Jacob's Ladder is a 1990 American psychological horror film directed by Adrian Lyne, produced by Alan Marshall and written by Bruce Joel Rubin. The film stars Tim Robbins as Jacob Singer, an American infantryman whose experiences before and during his service in Vietnam result in strange, fragmentary visions and bizarre hallucinations that continue to haunt him. As his ordeal worsens, Jacob desperately attempts to figure out the truth. The film's supporting cast includes Elizabeth Peña and Danny Aiello. 

Jacob's Ladder was made by Carolco Pictures ten years after being written by Rubin. Despite only being moderately successful upon its release, the film garnered a cult following, and its plot and special effects became a source of influence for various other works, such as the Silent Hill video game series. A remake was released in 2019.

Plot

On October 6, 1971, American infantryman Jacob Singer is with the 1st Air Cavalry Division, deployed in a village in Vietnam's Mekong Delta, when his close-knit unit comes under sudden attack. As many of Jacob's comrades are killed or wounded, others exhibit abnormal behavior with some suffering catatonia, convulsions, and seizures. Jacob flees into the jungle, only to be stabbed with a bayonet by an unseen assailant.

Jacob awakens in the New York City Subway, where, after glimpsing what he believes to be a tentacle protruding from a sleeping homeless person, an inexplicably locked subway station exit results in him almost being hit by a train. The year is 1975, he works as a postal clerk, and lives in a rundown apartment in Brooklyn with his girlfriend, Jezebel. Jacob misses his old family and experiences visions of them, especially the youngest of his sons, Gabe, who had died in an accident before the war. Jacob is increasingly beset by disturbing experiences and apparitions, including glimpses of faceless vibrating figures, and narrowly escapes being run over by a pursuing car. He attempts to contact his regular doctor at the local VA hospital, but after being told that there is no record of him ever being a patient there, Jacob is told that his doctor has died in a car explosion.

At a party thrown by friends, a psychic reads Jacob's palm and tells him that he is already dead, which Jacob dismisses as a joke. After declining to dance with her, he appears to witness an enormous creature penetrating Jezzie before he collapses. At home, Jacob experiences a dangerous fever, which Jezzie attempts to bring down with a painful ice bath. Jacob briefly wakes up in another reality where he lives with his wife and sons, including a still-alive Gabe. First-person perspective scenes of apparent flashbacks to his time in Vietnam show Jacob, badly wounded, being discovered by American soldiers before being evacuated under fire in a helicopter.

One of Jacob's former platoon mates, Paul, contacts him to reveal he is suffering from similar experiences, but is soon afterwards killed when his car explodes. Commiserating after the funeral, other surviving members of the platoon confess that they have all been experiencing horrifying hallucinations. Believing that they are suffering the effects of a military experiment performed on them without their knowledge or consent, they hire a lawyer to investigate. However, the lawyer quits the case after reading military files documenting that the soldiers were never in combat and were discharged for psychological reasons. Jacob's comrades soon back down while Jacob suspects they have been threatened into doing so. He is abducted by suited men who try to intimidate him. Jacob fights them and escapes but is injured and nearly paralyzed in the process. He is taken to a nightmarish hospital, where he is told he has been killed and this is home, but his chiropractor friend Louis comes to his rescue and heals him. Louis quotes the 14th-century Christian mystic Meister Eckhart:

Eckhart saw Hell too. He said: "The only thing that burns in Hell is the part of you that won't let go of life, your memories, your attachments. They burn them all away. But they're not punishing you", he said. "They're freeing your soul. So, if you're frightened of dying and ... you're holding on, you'll see devils tearing your life away. But if you've made your peace, then the devils are really angels, freeing you from the earth."

Jacob is approached by a distressed man who had been following him from a distance and who also dragged him away from Paul's burning car. Introducing himself as Michael Newman, he tells a story of having been a chemist with the Army's chemical warfare division where he designed a drug he called the Ladder, which massively increased aggression. Michael claims that, to test the drug's effectiveness, a dose was secretly given to Jacob's unit before the battle, causing some of them to turn on each other in a homicidal frenzy. Michael's story triggers a vision of Jacob's wounding in Vietnam, which shows his attacker as a fellow American soldier. Jacob returns to his family's home, where he finds Gabe, who takes him by the hand and leads him up the staircase into a bright light. The scene turns to a triage tent in 1971 as military doctors declare Jacob dead. The doctor takes one of his dog tags off his body and notes that Jacob had put up a tremendous fight to stay alive, but looked peaceful in death.

Cast

Production

The film's title refers to the Biblical story of Jacob's Ladder, or the dream of a meeting place between Heaven and Earth (Genesis 28:12). Its little-known alternative title is Dante's Inferno, in a reference to Inferno by Dante Alighieri. Screenwriter and co-producer Bruce Joel Rubin perceived the film as a modern interpretation of the Liberation Through Hearing During the Intermediate State, the Tibetan Book of the Dead. Rubin said: "The inspiration in a sense is my entire spiritual upbringing. Once you have a meditative life you start to see that the world is really far different than what it appears to be. What appears to be finite is really couched in the infinite, and the infinite imbues everything in our lives." Before writing his scripts for Jacob's Ladder and Ghost, which too was released in 1990, the Jewish-born Rubin spent two years in a Tibetan Buddhist monastery in Nepal; previously, he had also written afterlife-themed Brainstorm and Deadly Friend.

Rubin's work on Jacob's Ladder began in 1980, sparked by his nightmare in which he dreamt about being trapped in a subway. For several years, Rubin tried to sell the script, without success; Thom Mount of Universal Pictures said he "loved it, but it was not for his studio". Directors Michael Apted, Sidney Lumet and Ridley Scott all expressed an interest in making the film, but still no major studio was ready to invest in Rubin's "too metaphysical" stories as "Hollywood does not make ghost movies". Eventually, after Deadly Friend was filmed by Wes Craven in 1986, Rubin's screenplays for both Jacob's Ladder and Ghost were picked by Paramount Pictures. In 1988, Adrian Lyne, who described Rubin's work as "certainly one of the best scripts I've ever read", decided then to direct it instead of an adaptation of The Bonfire of the Vanities as he had originally planned (incidentally, Tom Hanks, an actor originally considered by Lyne for the role of Jacob, ended up starring in Bonfire). The ownership and policy changes at Paramount resulted in the cancellation of the project; the executives had doubts about the film's ending and the scenes taking place in Vietnam. The independent film studio Carolco Pictures decided to take over the production of Jacob's Ladder, giving Lyne a greater creative control and a budget of $25 million. Rubin became the film's co-producer, along with Mario Kassar, Alan Marshall and Andrew G. Vajna.

Lyne, who downplayed Rubin's "intimidating" Old Testament themes, said that he prepared for making the film by watching "endless" documentary films about the war in Vietnam and reading "countless" chronicles of near-death experiences. The film's plot device of a long period of subjective time passing in an instant has been explored by several authors. A particularly strong inspiration for both Rubin and Lyne was Robert Enrico's 1962 short film An Occurrence at Owl Creek Bridge, one of Lyne's favorite movies, which was in turn based on Ambrose Bierce's 1890 short story of the same title.

Cast in the role of Jacob, Tim Robbins said the film presented for him "a great opportunity to go in a different direction. I love doing comedy, but I know I can do other things as well." The film's military advisor was Vietnam veteran Captain Dale Dye, who provided a five-day boot camp military training for the actors playing soldiers in the Vietnam storyline (including Robbins, Pruitt Taylor Vince, Eriq La Salle and Ving Rhames). The war scenes were filmed in the Puerto Rico area of Vega Baja, featuring the UH-1 helicopters provided by the Puerto Rico National Guard.

All of the film's special effect sequences were filmed in camera, with no use of post production effects. In several scenes of Jacob's Ladder, Lyne used a body horror technique in which an actor is recorded shaking his head around at a low frame rate, resulting in horrifically fast motion when played back. In the Special Edition's commentary track, Lyne said he was inspired by the art of the painter Francis Bacon when developing the effect. In his screenplay, Rubin used traditional imagery of demons and hell. However, Lyne decided to use images similar to thalidomide deformities to achieve a greater shock effect. After many heated arguments, Lyne managed to convert Rubin to his vision. Lyne and Rubin used the works of the artist H. R. Giger and the photographers Diane Arbus and Joel-Peter Witkin for inspiration; another influence came from the Brothers Quay's 1986 stop motion short film Street of Crocodiles.

In the film, Jacob is told by Michael that the horrific events he experienced on his final day in Vietnam were the product of an experimental drug called "the Ladder", which was used on troops without their knowledge. At the end of the film, a message is displayed saying that reports of testing of BZ, NATO code for a deliriant and hallucinogen known as 3-quinuclidinyl benzilate, on U.S. soldiers during the Vietnam War were denied by the Pentagon. Lyne said a part of the inspiration for this motif was Martin A. Lee's book Acid Dreams: The CIA, LSD and Sixties Rebellion, but noted that "nothing in the book suggests that the drug BZ — a super-hallucinogen that has a tendency to elicit maniac behavior — was used on U.S. troops."

According to Lyne's audio commentary, test screenings indicated that the initial version of the film was overwhelming for the audience. In response, about 20 minutes of disturbing scenes, mostly from the last third of the film, were removed from the final cut.

Release

Theatrical release
Jacob's Ladder opened on November 2, 1990, distributed by TriStar Pictures. Jacob's Ladder: Original Motion Picture Soundtrack with the music by Maurice Jarre was released by Varèse Sarabande in 1993 and then by Waxwork Records in March 2020 on a single LP. Rubin's companion book, released by Applause Theater Book Publishers on the same day as the film, features a final draft of the screenplay, including the deleted scenes, and his essay on making of the screenplay and the film.

Home media
The Special Edition DVD was released by Artisan Entertainment on July 14, 1998, containing three deleted scenes ("Jezzie's Transformation", "The Antidote" and "The Train Station") along with several other special features, such as audio commentary by Adrian Lyne and a 26-minute making-of documentary "Building Jacob's Ladder". On September 14, 2010, the film was released on Blu-ray Disc by Lions Gate Entertainment and retains all of the special features of the DVD version, along with two promotional trailers, omitting only a TV spot that came with the DVD.

Reception

Box office
The film took the number one spot at the weekend box office in North America, garnering ticket sales of $7.5 million from 1,052 screens. However, the attendance dropped fast and its overall domestic box office result was only $26,118,851.

Critical reception
On review aggregator Rotten Tomatoes, 72% of 68 reviews are positive, with an average rating of 6.6/10. The site's consensus reads: "Even with its disorienting leaps of logic and structure, Jacob's Ladder is an engrossing, nerve-shattering experience". On Metacritic, the film has a score of 62 out of 100 based on reviews from 20 critics, indicating "generally favorable reviews". Audiences polled by CinemaScore gave the film an average grade of "C−" on an A+ to F scale.

Roger Ebert of the Chicago Sun-Times wrote that watching it left him "reeling with turmoil and confusion, with feelings of sadness and despair," and called it a "thoroughly painful and depressing experience — but, it must be said, one that has been powerfully written, directed and acted." He awarded the film three and a half out of a possible four stars. Janet Maslin of The New York Times wrote that this "slick, riveting, viscerally scary film about what in other hands would be a decidedly unsalable subject, namely death," is "both quaint and devastating."

Desson Thomson of The Washington Post felt disappointed with the film that is "ultimately flat on its surrealistic face, the victim of too many fake-art sequences." Owen Gleiberman of Entertainment Weekly wrote that "Jacob's Ladder is so 'dark' it sucks Robbins right down with it. By the time Jacob is being strapped to a bed and wheeled down a hospital corridor strewn with bloody limbs, it's hard to care whether the Orwellian image is a hallucination or not. You just want out." Kim Newman called the film "effectively the blunt remake" of Carnival of Souls.

According to IGN's review of the DVD release in 2004, "After movies like Se7en, it may not pack the same subtle horror for today's audiences it did when it was first released, but it's still a great film." IGN's review of Jacob's Ladders 2010 Blu-ray release called it "an emotionally poignant, creepy horror masterpiece." According to Slant Magazine, Jacob's Ladder is "a bizarrely cohesive hybrid of war movie, character study, art film, and horror flick" and "the very act of watching the film is so emotionally draining that the viewer leaves the film feeling worked-in; the thought of repeat viewings is daunting yet insatiable." John Kenneth Muir called the film's nightmarish hospital scene "one of the most terrifying moments in all of 1990s horror cinema." Muir further wrote: "In its musings about death, about the end we all fear, Jacob's Ladder proves a deeply affecting and meaningful motion picture. After a screening, you'll immediately want to hug the people you love and then go outside and breathe the fresh air, or otherwise affirm your very existence."

Rubin's script was included on the list of "Hollywood's ten best unproduced screenplays" by American Film magazine in 1983. In 1991, Jacob's Ladder was nominated at Horror Hall of Fame II for best horror film, losing to The Silence of the Lambs. The film was also featured in Bravo's 2004 documentary miniseries The 100 Scariest Movie Moments and in the 2009 book 1001 Movies You Must See Before You Die. In 2013, the Jacob Burns Film Center projectionist Andrew Robinson chose it as his favorite scary movie.

Legacy
Jacob's Ladder greatly inspired the horror franchise Silent Hill, including the video games Silent Hill (1999), Silent Hill 2 (2001), Silent Hill 3 (2003), Silent Hill 4: The Room (2004), and Silent Hill: Homecoming (2007), as well as the series' 2006 film adaptation by Christophe Gans. The film's influence on their works was also recognized by Ryan Murphy, writer of the 2011 TV series American Horror Story: Asylum, and by Shinji Mikami, creator of the Resident Evil series and director of the 2014 video game The Evil Within. Kim Manners prepared for directing The X-Files episode "Grotesque" by listening to the music from Jacob's Ladder. The music video for the 2010 song "Nightmare" by Avenged Sevenfold is an homage to the famous hospital scene from the film, chosen by the director Wayne Isham, because the band's deceased drummer The Rev was a fan of the film.

Jacob's Ladder as a film is directly referred to in Silent Hill 2 and especially Silent Hill 3. Other references to the film itself include the mentions in the 2002 The Twilight Zone episode "Night Route" (dialog) and the 2010 The Simpsons episode "The Squirt and the Whale" (visual). Rick and Morty references the film in Season 4, Episode 6: "Never Ricking Morty" with a flashback when Morty stabs Rick with a bayonet, reminiscent of what happens to the main protagonist at the beginning of the film.

In music, Claytown Troupe used a sample of Michael's quote 'It's a fast trip ... ' at the beginning of the track "Rainbow's Edge" from their 1991 album Out There. UNKLE sampled dialogue from the film in their 1998 "Rabbit in Your Headlights" and again in 2003 in "Inside". VNV Nation's track "Forsaken" from the 1998 album Praise the Fallen ends with the quotation from Eckhart. "Devils" from IVardensphere's 2011 album APOK begins with the same quotation. A sample of Jacob's cry 'Stop it, you're killing me!' is used in "Next in Line" from Nevermore's 1996 album The Politics of Ecstasy. Terminal Sect extensively sampled the film for their track "Where Angels Fall".

The film's possible influence can be arguably seen in many other works ranging from M. Night Shyamalan's 1999 hit psychological horror film The Sixth Sense to Peter Arnett's controversial 1998 CNN report "Valley of Death" about the 1970 Operation Tailwind. Jeff Millar of Houston Chronicle wrote that Giuseppe Tornatore's 1994 psychological thriller A Pure Formality uses the plot device of Jacob's Ladder mixed with several other sources. According to Premiere, Massy Tadjedin's 2005 psychological thriller The Jacket "is a film for those who don't remember Jacob's Ladder, perhaps for someone like Jacob himself," as it "resembles Jacob's Ladder too much for its own good."

Remake

A remake directed by David M. Rosenthal and written by Jeff Buhler, Sarah Thorp and Jake Wade Wall was released in 2019, to overwhelmingly negative reception. The film stars Michael Ealy, Jesse Williams, Nicole Beharie, Karla Souza, and Guy Burnet.

See also
 Conspiracy fiction and paranoid fiction
 Cotard delusion
 List of anti-war films
 List of films featuring hallucinogens
 List of nonlinear narrative films
 The Manchurian Candidate (1962)
 The Manchurian Candidate (2004)
 Unethical human experimentation in the United States
 Vietnam War in film

References

External links

 
 
 
 
 Jacob's Ladder at the Movie Review Query Engine

1990 films
1990 horror films
American psychological horror films
American supernatural horror films
American thriller films
Anti-war films
Carolco Pictures films
Films about death
Existentialist films
Fiction with unreliable narrators
Films about angels
Films about nightmares
Films directed by Adrian Lyne
Films scored by Maurice Jarre
Films set in 1971
Films set in 1975
Films set in New York City
Films shot from the first-person perspective
Films shot in New Jersey
Films shot in Puerto Rico
American nonlinear narrative films
1990s psychological horror films
Religious horror films
Films with screenplays by Bruce Joel Rubin
TriStar Pictures films
Vietnam War films
Horror war films
1990s English-language films
1990s American films